Choustníkovo Hradiště is a market town in Trutnov District in the Hradec Králové Region of the Czech Republic. It has about 600 inhabitants.

References

Market towns in the Czech Republic
Populated places in Trutnov District